Regiane Fernanda Aparecida Bidias (born October 2, 1986) is a Brazilian volleyball player, a member of the Brazil women's national volleyball team.

Clubs
  Rio de Janeiro (2004–2017)
  ŁKS Commercecon Łódź (2017–2019)
  Bartoccini Gioiellerie Perugia (2019–)
  UNI OPOLE (2021-2022)

Awards

Individuals
 2004 U20 South American Championship – "Most Valuable Player"
 2004 U20 South American Championship – "Best Spiker"
 2009 Final Four Cup – "Best Spiker"
 2018–19 Polish League – "Most Valuable Player"

Clubs 

 2004–05 Brazilian Superliga –  Runner-up, with Rexona-Ades
 2005–06 Brazilian Superliga –  Champion, with Rexona-Ades
 2006–07 Brazilian Superliga –  Champion, with Rexona-Ades
 2007–08 Brazilian Superliga –  Champion, with Rexona-Ades
 2008–09 Brazilian Superliga –  Champion, with Rexona-Ades
 2009–10 Brazilian Superliga –  Runner-up, with Unilever Vôlei
 2010–11 Brazilian Superliga –  Champion, with Unilever Vôlei
 2011–12 Brazilian Superliga –  Runner-up, with Unilever Vôlei
 2012–13 Brazilian Superliga –  Champion, with Unilever Vôlei
 2013–14 Brazilian Superliga –  Champion, with Rexona-Ades
 2014–15 Brazilian Superliga –  Champion, with Rexona-Ades
 2015–16 Brazilian Superliga –  Champion, with Rexona-Ades
 2016–17 Brazilian Superliga –  Champion, with Rexona-SESC
 2017–18 Polish League –  Runner-up, with ŁKS Commercecon Łódź
 2018–19 Polish League –  Champion, with ŁKS Commercecon Łódź
 2009 South American Club Championship –  Champion, with Rexona-Ades
 2013 South American Club Championship –  Champion, with Unilever Vôlei
 2015 South American Club Championship –  Champion, with Rexona-Ades
 2016 South American Club Championship –  Champion, with Rexona-Ades
 2017 South American Club Championship –  Champion, with Rexona-Sesc
 2013 FIVB Club World Championship –  Runner-up, with Rexona-Ades
 2017 FIVB Club World Championship –  Runner-up, with Rexona-Sesc

National team 
  2002 U20 South American Championship
  2004 U20 South American Championship
  2005 FIVB U20 World Championship
  2007 Pan American Games
  2008 Pan-American Cup
  2009 Pan-American Cup
  2009 Montreux Volley Masters
  2009 World Grand Prix
  2011 Summer Universiade
  2013 Summer Universiade

References

External links
WorldofVolley profile
FIVB profile
LSK.PLPS profile

1986 births
Living people
People from Piracicaba
Brazilian women's volleyball players
Outside hitters
Expatriate volleyball players in Poland
Brazilian expatriates in Poland
Universiade medalists in volleyball
Universiade gold medalists for Brazil
Universiade silver medalists for Brazil
Pan American Games medalists in volleyball
Pan American Games silver medalists for Brazil
Volleyball players at the 2007 Pan American Games
Medalists at the 2011 Summer Universiade
Medalists at the 2013 Summer Universiade
Medalists at the 2007 Pan American Games
Sportspeople from São Paulo (state)